The Buick Regal is a line of mid-size cars marketed by Buick since 1973.  For nearly its entire production, the Regal has served as the premium mid-size/intermediate offering of the Buick product range. Introduced as a submodel of the Buick Century, the model line is currently in its sixth generation.  From the 1970s to the 1990s, the Regal served as the Buick counterpart of the Pontiac Grand Prix and Oldsmobile Cutlass Supreme.

Originally introduced as a personal luxury coupe, the Regal was later expanded to a full model line.  To showcase its success in NASCAR racing, from 1982 to 1987, Buick introduced the Buick Regal Grand National, Regal T-Type, and the limited-production Buick GNX.  During the 1990s, while the four-door sedan superseded the two-door coupe entirely, forced-induction engines made their return, with superchargers replacing turbochargers.

For 1999, the Buick Regal inaugurated the sale of GM vehicles in the Chinese market, with the 1997 design lasting through 2008.  Following the 2004 model year, Buick retired the nameplate in North America, with the Regal replaced by the Buick LaCrosse.

For 2008, Opel introduced the Opel Insignia as its largest sedan, with Buick rebranding the model line as the Regal for the Chinese market.  For 2011, GM reintroduced the Regal to North America, rebranding the Insignia sedan for North America.  For 2018, Buick introduced the second-generation Opel Insignia, sourcing all production from Germany; alongside a first-ever liftback sedan, the Regal TourX was the first Buick station wagon in 22 years.

After 2020, as the division shifted away from car model lines, Buick ended sales of the Regal in North America.

First generation (1973-1977) 

Buick had been the first GM division to bring a personal luxury car to market with its 1963 Riviera, but was otherwise slow to react to the developing lower-priced mid-size personal luxury market, which Pontiac created with the 1969 Grand Prix and Chevrolet with the Monte Carlo the following year, 1970. At the same time, Oldsmobile added a formal notchback coupé to its intermediate line, the Cutlass Supreme, in 1970 and that model soon became Olds' best-selling intermediate. Buick did not get its own personal luxury coupe until the GM intermediates were redesigned in 1973, the so-called "Colonnade" cars that eliminated hardtop models completely. In a curious name swap, the Skylark name was dropped from Buick's intermediate line and instead the Century nameplate, last used in the 1950s, was revived for them.

A highly trimmed, two-door coupe, the first Regal, officially marketed as the "Century Regal Colonnade Hardtop coupe", shared its front and rear styling with its Century parent with distinctions amounting to differing grilles and taillight lenses. The Regal shared the same "Colonnade" pillared hardtop roofline (a hardtop with B-pillars (center pillars) but frameless doors unlike a sedan body) and greenhouse (window area) with the Grand Prix, Monte Carlo, and Cutlass Supreme as well as the lower-priced Buick Century Luxus coupe. Like its corporate cousins, the Regal (and Luxus) featured the newly fashionable opera windows, which were small fixed rear-side windows surrounded by sheetmetal, instead of the traditional roll-down windows.

For the first model year in 1973, the Regal nameplate was only used for Buick's version of the GM intermediate personal luxury coupe, but the following year gained a sedan companion (there was no Regal station wagon).

The Century moniker was discontinued for 1976, with the model now marketed as the Buick Regal.

Interiors were generally more luxurious than lesser Century models with woodgrain trim on dashboard and door panels, along with door-pull straps and bench seats with center armrests with cloth, velour, or vinyl upholstery. Optionally available throughout the run was a 60/40 split-bench seat with armrest. For 1976 and 1977, the Regal coupe was available with the S/R option that included reclining bucket seats with corduroy upholstery.

The model lasted five years with minimal changes, although there was a fairly substantial facelift for the coupe for 1976. The sedan retained its original 1973 sheetmetal through 1977. 1976 models incorporated the recently legalized rectangular headlights, horizontally mounted on the coupe, and vertically on the sedan. The Regal coupe sold reasonably well, although it lagged behind the Monte Carlo and Cutlass Supreme which had become the best-selling cars in America by 1976, with a listed retail price in 1976 of $4,910 ($ in  dollars ).

The Regal was most commonly powered by Buick's  V8, which was standard equipment on all models for 1973 and 1974, and optional on coupes but standard on sedans from 1975 to 1977, and the larger  V8 was optional for 1973 and 1974 models only. Starting in 1975, Regal coupes came standard with Buick's resurrected  V6 engine previously offered on the 1964–1967 Skylark; the engine's tooling had been sold to Kaiser Motors for use in Jeep models (Kaiser was purchased by American Motors in 1970 and Jeep became an AMC division) and sold back to GM by AMC in 1974. For 1975 and 1976, the Century and Regal were the only mid-sized cars in America to offer V6 engines. The bolt pattern for this vehicle is 5×.

Production Figures:

Second generation (1978-1987) 

A downsized Regal appeared for the 1978 model year with Buick's new  V6 engine as standard equipment and a revised version of the venerable  V6 as an option (which became standard for 1980). Initially, a three-speed manual transmission was standard but this was later replaced by an automatic. At the time of introduction, Regals were available exclusively as coupés with the Century nameplate applied to standard equipment sedans and station wagons. In January 1982 the Century was replaced by an all-new car on the front-wheel drive A platform, which meant that the Regal gained a four-door sedan and five-door station wagon - essentially facelifted and rebadged versions of the previous year's rear-wheel drive Century. It was the first time the name appeared on a full model lineup. The wagon was discontinued after 1983, and the sedan dropped from the lineup the next year. This generation Regal lasted ten years. The base model was equipped with softer-riding luxury suspension, and did not offer a manual transmission in later years.

The 1978 Regal could be equipped with a  Turbocharged V6 engine with automatic transmission, and was known as a Regal Sport Coupe. The Buick LeSabre was also available with the turbocharged engine. The only other turbocharged cars available in the U.S. market in 1978 were imports from Mercedes-Benz, Porsche and Saab. The Regal Sport Coupe also included a firm handling suspension with larger tires and sport wheels. Bucket seats and a center console with a T-shifter were also available.

For 1980, the Regal was offered in a special Somerset Limited Edition trim which featured unique tan and dark blue designer exterior paint, wire wheel covers, sport mirrors, and chrome Somerset badging. The interior had tan and blue plush velour upholstery, brushed chrome trim, and additional Somerset badging. A Somerset Limited Edition model was also offered on the restyled 1981 Regal. It had unique dark sandstone and camel exterior paint, sport mirrors, and turbine wheels. The interior's plush velour upholstery was camel with dark brown piping.

A major facelift for 1981 gave the Regal a much more aerodynamic profile, helping make it possible for the car to compete on the NASCAR racing circuit. The sloping hood and nose of the car made it the favorite of several NASCAR teams, and reduced the drag coefficient by eighteen percent. Richard Petty drove one to victory in the 1981 Daytona 500, and the car won a majority of the 1981 and 1982 seasons races and won the NASCAR manufacturers title in 1981 and 1982.

From 1986 to 1987, the  V8 was available as an option. The  2-bbl V6 was standard. The 200-4R overdrive transmission was an option with either engine.

Buick Regal Production Figures:

Grand National, Turbo-T and T-Type 

In 1978, the first turbocharged Regal was introduced as the Regal Sport Coupe.

In February 1982, the Grand National debuted, which was named for the NASCAR Winston Cup Grand National Series (the "Grand National" term was part of the Cup series nomenclature until 1986). Buick had won the Manufacturers Cup in 1981 and 1982, and wanted to capitalize on its success: "What wins on Sunday, sells on Monday", and hoping to revive their performance image from the 1960s with the Buick Skylark Gran Sport. These 1982 cars were not painted black, which may confuse those not familiar with them. All started out as charcoal gray Regals that were shipped off to a subcontractor for finishing.

Originally intended for a run of 100 units, Cars and Concepts of Brighton, Michigan, retrofitted 215 Regals with the GN package. Most obvious was the light silver-gray firemist paint added to each side. Red pinstripes and billboard shadow lettering proclaiming "Buick" were applied. The wheel opening moldings and rocker panel moldings were blacked out using black vinyl tape. Finally, a front air dam and rear spoiler were installed. On the inside, special "Lear-Siegler" seats were installed. These seats are fully adjustable and were covered with silver brandon cloth with black vinyl inserts. The front seat had Buick's "6" emblem embroidered onto them. Also, a special clock delete plate was added to the instrument panel which contained the yellow and orange "6" logo and the words "Grand National Buick Motor Division".)

There were only 2022 Sport coupes produced in 1982, and the number of cars with both the GN and Sport coupe packages is estimated to be fewer than 50.

For 1983, there was no Grand National. The power gains came courtesy of a low-restriction dual exhaust, stainless steel headers (rather than the original cast iron items), and other detail improvements. Drivability was improved thanks to better electronics for the exhaust gas recirculation system as well as the knock sensor. The T-Type trim name had been used on other Buicks, starting with the Riviera in 1981 (in 1979 and 1980, it was the S-Type). Other improvements on the 1983 Regal T-Type included Hydro-Boost II brakes, 200-4R four-speed overdrive transmission replacing the earlier three-speed, and a 3.42 rear axle (7.5"). Inside there were new bucket seats and a sport steering wheel and quicker steering ratio, while the suspension was honed with a larger diameter anti-roll bar, altered spring rates, and re-valved shock absorbers.

For 1984, the Grand National returned, now in all black paint. Only 5,204 turbo Regals were produced that year, only 2,000 of which were Grand Nationals. Because this was the first year of production of the computer-controlled sequential fuel injection and distributor-less ignition, this is often considered the year and model that started the development of the legendary intercooled Grand Nationals. Soon, performance enthusiasts determined the modifications that worked and the Grand Nationals easily broke into the 13-second territory. All Grand Nationals had the Lear Siegler-made cloth/leather interior which was only available for this year. An estimated 200 of the 1984 Grand Nationals were produced with the Astroroof option which makes these the rarest of the Grand Nationals.

The Grand Nationals (quantity 5,512) and T-Types (quantity 2,384) were both produced in 1986. Buick dropped the T-Type package for Regal for 1987 models and opted for a "T" sport package instead. There were only 7,896 turbo Regals produced in 1986. In 1987, when turbo Regals reached their peak in popularity, a total of 27,590 turbo Regals were produced through December, with those models produced between September and December of that year window stickered as "1987½ Buick Grand National" vehicles.

For 1987, a lightweight WE4 (Turbo-T) option was offered. Only 1,547 of this variant were produced. The differences between a WE4 and the Grand National were the interior trim package, wheels, exterior badging, aluminum bumper supports, and aluminum rear drum brakes as opposed to the Grand National's cast iron, making the WE4 a lighter and faster car. The rear spoiler was only available as a dealer-installed option. 1987 was the only year that the LC2 turbo option was available on any Regal, making it possible to even see a Limited with a vinyl landau roof and a power bulge turbo hood. Turbo Regal Limiteds were one of the rarest models of turbo Regals produced second only to the GNX at 1,035 turbo Limiteds. Turbo Regal Limiteds could be ordered with many options with most having chrome external trim but for $35 could have been built with the full black-out trim WO2 option making them extremely rare (similarly, a base Regal could also be ordered with the Turbo 6, and, the WO2 blackout trim was also available; all rare). Limiteds were treated to a very luxurious interior with plush carpeting and optional bench pillow seats and a column shift. It was also possible to order the 1987 Regal T with the 5.0/307 V8 instead of the turbo 3.8/231 V6. The 1987 model would be the end of the manufacture of the RWD "G-Body" Regal, but GM had to extend the build of the Grand National to meet customer demand into December.

GNX

For the final year, 1987, Buick introduced the limited production GNX, for "Grand National Experimental", at $29,900 ($ in  dollars). Made in partnership with McLaren Performance Technologies/ASC, Buick produced only 547 GNs with the interior trim package, that were then sent off to McLaren and upgraded into the Buick GNX. This was created to be the "Grand National to end all Grand Nationals". 

Changes made included a special Garrett AiResearch T-3 turbocharger with a ceramic-impeller blowing through a more efficient and significantly larger capacity intercooler with a "Cermatel (ceramic-aluminum) coated" pipe connecting the intercooler to the engine. A GNX specific EPROM, low-restriction exhaust with dual mufflers, reprogrammed turbo Hydramatic 200-4R transmission with a custom torque converter and transmission cooler, and unique differential cover/Panhard bar included more of the performance modifications. Exterior styling changes include vents located on each front fender, 16 inch black mesh style wheels with VR-speed rated tires, and deletion of the hood and fender emblems. The interior changes of the GNX included a serial number on the dash plaque and a revised instrument cluster providing Stewart-Warner analog gauges, including an analog turbo boost gauge. The GNX used a unique torque arm that was mounted to a special, GNX only, rear differential cover, for increased traction. The torque arm rear suspension alters the suspension geometry, making the body lift while planting the rear tires down, resulting in increased traction. GNX #001 is the 1986 prototype currently owned by Buick and sometimes makes appearances at car shows around the US. 

Dragstrip performance was measured as faster than the Ferrari F40 and the Porsche 930 with a  time of 12.7 seconds at  (0.3 and 0.8 seconds quicker, 2.9 and  faster) and a 0- time of 4.6 seconds (0.4 and 0.3 seconds quicker, respectively). 

The stealthy appearance of the all-black GNX and Grand National (and the resemblance of its grill to his helmet's mouthpiece), coupled with the fact that the Grand National was initially released during the popularity of Star Wars movies, earned it the title "Darth Vader's Car". Car and Driver covered the GNX model's introduction with the headline "Lord Vader, your car is ready". Due to the turbocharged six-cylinder engine, the Buick make, and the black paint Grand Nationals were sometimes referred to as the "Dark Side". The "Dark Side" contrasted with the more common V8 Mustangs and Camaros that were popular at the time.

Third generation (1988-1996) 

A new Regal appeared in October 1987 on the GM W platform as the first vehicle on that platform; this generation ran with few changes for nine years. Though the new Regal returned to Buick's original concept in being offered only as a coupe and in being aimed once again squarely at the personal luxury buyer, it departed from tradition in being the first front-wheel-drive model, and in having no serious performance option or edition. Neither a V8 engine nor a turbocharged V6 was offered; the only engine available for 1988 was the Chevrolet 2.8 L V6, producing . From mid-1990, owing to the declining personal luxury car market, a four-door sedan version of the Regal was re-introduced (simulataneously as the Cutlass Supreme and Grand Prix, the latter offered as a sedan for the first time). However, sales of the new sedan were delayed until the 1991 model year.

The Regal was initially offered in base Custom and upscale Limited trim lines. For 1989, the Gran Sport trim line was added, featuring aluminum wheels, body side cladding and a console-mounted shifter attached to the 4-speed automatic. For 1990, the Regal gained the option of the Buick 3.8 L V6. The 3800 V6 was unique to the Regal, differentiating it from the mechanically similar Chevrolet Lumina, Oldsmobile Cutlass Supreme and Pontiac Grand Prix. Anti-lock brakes were made standard on all but the base Custom cars from 1992, and the grille was redesigned again for 1993. Along with the new look came an electronically controlled automatic transmission and LeSabre-like rear lights and bumper. For 1993, a driver's side airbag was added, along with standard ABS on all models, standard power windows, and  more in the base engine due to a revised intake manifold and cylinder head. The Limited coupe was deleted; only the Custom and Gran Sport (GS) coupes remained. Dual airbags were new for 1995 along with a new interior.

For 1996, the larger  V6 engine became the 3800 Series II and gained .This generation saw the installation of Dynaride, which was an air compressor that would pressurize the rear Chapman Struts to maintain a level overall ride height. A badge was installed on the dashboard to the left of the steering column on all vehicles equipped. It was not available on vehicles equipped with Gran Touring Suspension.

Production Figures

Engines 
 1988–1989 2.8 L (170 in³) Chevrolet LB6 MFI V6,  and 
 1989–1993 3.1 L (191 in³) Chevrolet LH0 MFI V6,  and 
 1994–1996 3.1 L (191 in³) Chevrolet L82 SFI V6,  and 
 1990–1995 3.8 L (231 in³) Buick L27 V6,  and 
 1996 3.8 L (231 in³) Buick L36 V6,  and

Fourth generation (1997) 

For the 1997 model year, the Century and Regal once again rode upon the same platform; the revised W platform that was shared with the Oldsmobile Intrigue, the Pontiac Grand Prix, the Chevrolet Lumina and Chevrolet Monte Carlo. The Regal coupe was discontinued.

Differences between the Regal and Century were mostly cosmetic. As the upmarket version, the Regal offered larger engines and fancier trim, and once again boasted a newer version of the 3.8 L V6. While the Century was mainly a reliable, economy-minded car based upon the W-body, the Regal was fitted with many amenities, including heated leather seats (optional on the Century), a Monsoon 8-speaker surround sound system, dual climate control, and expansive interior space. Few changes occurred during this version's seven-year run. It offered 5-passenger seating on all trim levels like the Pontiac Grand Prix and Oldsmobile Intrigue (formerly Cutlass Supreme), unlike their predecessors that had optional 6-passenger seating and the Buick Century (formerly built on the A platform) which had standard 6-passenger seating.

This period held the fastest Buick since the days of the 1987 GNX: the Buick Regal GS. When introduced in January 1997, Buick advertised the Regal GS as "The official car of the supercharged family". Buick also released two other model types, the LSE and the GSE. The LSE stayed with the  engine with upgrades and the GSE stayed with the  supercharged engine with upgrades. Also, in 2000 Buick came out with a concept GSX that had an intercooled 3.8 L, but was supercharged rather than turbocharged. It had 

The North American Regal was replaced in 2005 by the Buick LaCrosse, also built on the W platform. The final 2004 Buick Regal rolled off the assembly line on June 1, 2004.

Engines 
 1997–2004 3.8 L L36 Series II V6
 1997–2004 3.8 L L67 Series II supercharged V6

Regal LS and GS performance 

The Regal LS from the factory had a 1/4 mile (≈400 m) elapsed time (ET) of 15.8 seconds and could do 0-60 mph in under 8 seconds. The supercharged Regal GS had a 1/4 mile ET of 14.9 seconds, and acceleration to  took 6.7 seconds. The Regal GS, equipped with the supercharged 3.8 liter V6 engine (L67) produced  &  of torque. The Regal GS's PCM has programming that activates torque management to reduce wheel spin at launch. The Regal LS was EPA rated at 19/30 MPG city/freeway while the supercharged Regal GS was EPA rated at 18/27 MPG city/freeway.

Regal LSX and GSX (SLP Performance) 

In the 2003 and 2004 model years, Buick, in collaboration with SLP Performance, came out with the Buick Regal GSX. They offered dealer-installed options and dealer-supplied accessories for both LS and GS models. Like the GS Buicks that came before it, the SLP GSX came in three power train packages, referred to as stages. The Stage 1 package added 10 horsepower with the addition of a dual stainless steel cat-back exhaust system and free-flowing cold air induction system. If you opted for the Stage 2 package, a Hypertech Power Programmer with an SLP custom calibration tune was included with the Stage 1 components — good for an extra 20 horsepower. The range-topping Stage 3 package added a 3.5-inch smaller diameter supercharger pulley to crank up the boost. Since the parts were available from SLP over the counter for many years, there have been quite a few Regal GS sedans that have been cloned into a GSX for both appearance and performance purposes. Though the model didn't officially debut until 2003, a licensed SLP dealer could perform the transformation on any Regal GS from 1997 to 2004. A true GSX can be verified from an SLP door jamb label with the correct part number for the kit.

Joseph Abboud Edition
From 2001 to 2004 Buick offered a Joseph Abboud appearance package on both the GS and LS models. This package included either a solid taupe or two-tone taupe/chestnut leather seats, two-tone leather-wrapped steering wheel, leather shifter handle and boot, 16" aluminum wheels; and Joseph Abboud signature emblems on the front doors, floor mats, front-seat headrests, and taillights.

China 

General Motors and Shanghai Automotive Industry Corporation (SAIC) established a joint venture in 1997 called Shanghai GM, and had begun assembling the Buick Regal in Shanghai, China in April 1999.

The Regal has sold well in the Chinese market as a large, relatively luxurious model, despite its high price, costing more than the North American version. The Chinese market Regal has different front- and rear-end styling compared to the North American version and different engines, including the 2.0 L L34, the 2.5 L LB8 V6 and the 3.0 L LW9 V6. Gearbox choices were a 4-speed automatic for V6 models, while four-cylinder variants are paired with a 5-speed manual gearbox. V6 models had a set of black dashboard gauges, while the four-cylinder models had white dashboard gauges. These models also had slightly different names: the entry-level model was the New Century, with more upscale models carrying the GL and GLX names. Later, G and GS models were added. Production for this generation ended in November 2008 in China being replaced by the Opel Insignia-based Regal.

The Chinese-built Regal was also sold in the Philippines from 2005 to 2006 as the Chevrolet Lumina, where it replaced the Opel Vectra. The 2.5 V6 was the only engine option. The Chevrolet Lumina was discontinued from the Filipino market in 2006, leaving GM again without a mid-size sedan until the introduction of the eighth generation Chevrolet Malibu in 2013.

Fifth generation (2008) 

The fifth-generation Buick Regal is a four-door, five-passenger, midsized sedan with a front engine, front-wheel drive layout. According to GM published information, more than 41 percent of Regal buyers in the US came from non-General Motors brands, and more than 60 percent of CXL Turbo buyers were under the age of 55.

Development 
The fifth generation Buick Regal rides on GM's Epsilon II platform and is mostly identical to the Opel Insignia. It first went into production in Rüsselsheim, Germany, in 2008. The Shanghai GM twin of the Insignia was introduced in China as Buick Regal in December, 2008 for the 2009 model year.

GM originally planned to sell a modified version of the Opel Insignia in North America as the second generation Saturn Aura, but changed strategy after deciding to discontinue the Saturn brand. The Regal utilizes unibody construction with galvanized steel front fenders, hood, roof and door panels and thermoplastic polyolefin (TPO) bumper covers. The North American Regal weighs about  more than an equivalent Opel Insignia due to increased structural support in the B-pillar necessary to meet U.S. rollover standards.

Buick's product manager director Roger McCormack stated in a 2010 consumer webchat that a coupé version was under heavy consideration, as well as the possibility for further body styles such as a convertible. An Buick-badged Insignia Sports Tourer was also spied, but the following year a Buick spokesperson declared that there were no plans to sell a Regal wagon.

Marketing 
GM revealed the fifth-generation Regal to North American dealers on October 14, 2009, and introduced the Regal to the public in November 2009 at the LA Auto Show. Sales of the Regal began in February 2010. In North America, the Regal is positioned below the larger, more expensive LaCrosse and above the Verano compact sedan which debuted late in calendar year 2011.

Production 

Production of the Shanghai GM variant of the Regal began in November 2008 and ended in July 2017. North American production at General Motors of Canada's Oshawa, Ontario, assembly plant was confirmed on November 25, 2009, and production began at Oshawa Car Assembly in February 2011. The initial production for the North American market was done together with its Opel twin the Opel Insignia in the Adam Opel AG's Rüsselsheim, Germany assembly plant from March 1, 2010, to March 25, 2011 (33,669 cars in 2010 and 12,637 in 2011).

Trim levels

CXL 

The 2011 Regal manufactured in North America was offered in a single trim level, marketed as CXL, offered with two engine choices and seven option packages. Buick had planned to offer a lower-level trim called CX with cloth seats and a higher level trim called CXS, but those trim levels were not offered.

CXL Turbo 
The 2.0L turbo is the first direct-injected turbocharged production car capable of running on any blend of gasoline or E85 ethanol.

GS 

At the 2010 North American International Auto Show in Detroit, GM showed a concept GS version of the Regal based on the Opel Insignia OPC and the Vauxhall Insignia VXR.

The production GS leaves most of the concept specifications intact, but is front-wheel drive. The GS features Buick's Interactive Drive Control System with GS mode, a choice of an FGP Germany F40-6 six-speed manual or Aisin AF-40 (G2) six-speed automatic transmission, high performance brakes with Brembo front calipers and high performance strut (HiPerStrut) front suspension. 19 inch wheels will be standard and 20 inch forged aluminum wheels will be available. The GS is expected to accelerate from 0 to 60 mph (97 km/h) in under 7 seconds. The GM LHU engine used in the GS trim makes 135 hp per liter - Buick's highest specific output ever. The GS went on sale in fall 2011 as a 2012 model.

Shanghai GM's locally produced variant of the Regal GS went on sale in China on September 15, 2011. The car is only offered in this case as a front-wheel-drive. There exist also some interior and exterior differences between the American and Chinese models.

Sport Touring Edition 
For 2016, the Regal added a new Sport Touring Edition which included unique 18" aluminum black pocket wheels and a rear lip spoiler.

eAssist 

Beginning in 2011, Buick began offering the eAssist system in the Regal, The 2012 model year Regal is the second GM vehicle to offer eAssist after the 2012 Buick LaCrosse. The eAssist system is standard in the LaCrosse 2.5 L I4, but the eAssist powertrain is optional in the Regal.

The eAssist system adds a lithium-ion battery housed in the trunk, along with regenerative braking, engine stop/start, fuel cut-off, grille louvres that close at speed, underbody panels and low-rolling resistance tires. Fuel economy for the Regal with eAssist is estimated at  city,  highway.

2014 Update 

GM revealed an updated 2014 Regal at the 2013 New York Auto Show. Changes include a revised interior and exterior, a boost in performance for the CXL Turbo up to 258 hp (192 kW) and 295 lb·ft (400 N·m) of torque, and an available all-wheel drive option offered for the 2.0L engine/6-speed automatic transmission equipped vehicles. Changes for the GS include revised interior and exterior, a drop in power to match that of the CXL Turbo, and available an all-wheel-drive option offered for the 2.0L / six-speed automatic transmission equipped vehicles. The six-speed manual transmission is still offered, but only in the front-wheel-drive variant. Buick's VentiPorts have reappeared starting with 2014 models, a styling feature unique to Buick that dates back to 1949.

 

Several new safety features were added for the 2014 year, which include forward collision warning, lane-departure warning, blind-spot monitoring, rear cross-traffic alert, and a following-distance indicator. The foregoing are all part of a Driver Confidence package, while collision preparation, which pre-loads the brake system ahead of an imminent collision, and adaptive cruise control are available separately.

Sixth generation (2018) 

On April 4, 2017, the sixth-generation 2018 Buick Regal was introduced at the GM Design Dome in Warren, Michigan; sales of the model line began in China on July 21, 2017.  In line with the previous generation, the Regal was developed by Opel in Germany as a counterpart of the Opel/Vauxhall Insignia, with Australia and New Zealand receiving the model line as the Holden ZB Commodore.  Production of the American-market Regal was moved back from GM Canada to Opel in Russelsheim.

Shifting away from the previous 4-door sedan bodystyle, the Regal was expanded to a five-door liftback sedan and a 5-door station wagon (the first Buick station wagon since the 1996 Roadmaster and Century Estates).  Both the liftback and the wagon were shared with the Insignia and the Commodore.

Regal Sportback

Replacing the Regal four-door sedan, the Regal Sportback is a fastback 5-door liftback sedan.  While adopting a sedan-style roofline, the hatchback configuration was adopted to provide additional cargo space.  Though larger in size than its predecessor, the Sportback weighs  lighter than the previous-generation Regal sedan.

The Sportback is available with either front-wheel drive or all-wheel drive.

The Sportback bodystyle was offered in 1SV (base), Preferred, Essence, Avenir, and GS trims.

Regal TourX

The Regal TourX 5-door station wagon, a Buick version of the Opel/Vauxhall Insignia Country Tourer, was introduced alongside the Sportback.  The first Regal station wagon in 35 years, the TourX was the first Buick station wagon since the retirement of the Roadmaster and Century Estates after 1996.

Sized between the Subaru Outback and the Volvo V90 wagons, the TourX was styled with standard dark-gray plastic body cladding.  While offered with standard all-wheel drive, the model line was not branded as a hard-core off-road vehicle, instead as a sportier touring vehicle.  With 73.5 cubic feet of cargo space (matching the Outback), the TourX held the most cargo of any Buick vehicle (with the exception of the three-row Buick Enclave).

Sharing its engine with the Sportback, the TourX was fitted with a LTG turbocharged 2.0-liter inline-4, providing  and  mated with an eight-speed automatic transmission.

The TourX was offered with 1SV (base), Preferred, and Essence trims (not offering the Avenir and GS versions).

GS

Carried over from the previous generation, the Regal GS returned as a performance-oriented version of the Regal Sportback.  Several revisions were made to the option package, as the previous LTG engine was replaced by a  3.6 liter LGX V6 (shared with the Commodore VXR); the 6-speed manual and automatic transmissions were replaced by a 9-speed automatic.  To accommodate the extra power, all-wheel drive was made standard.

Externally, the GS was distinguished by its own front fascia and grille and was fitted with its own instrument panel and front seats.

Discontinuation
In December 2019, General Motors announced that it would stop the importation of the Buick Regal for North America after the 2020 model year.  Following the 2020 withdrawal of the Cascada and LaCrosse, Buick ended sales of cars in North America after 113 years in favor of a line of sport utility vehicles (SUVs).

Alongside shifting consumer tastes, the discontinuation of the Regal in North America was also influenced by the sale of Opel and Vauxhall to PSA Group.  While the latter did not operate in North America in 2017, at the end of 2019, PSA Group acquired FCA, which creating Stellantis (the current parent company of Chrysler in North America).

In China, SAIC-GM continues to produce the Opel-designed Regal sedan, slotted between the Verano and LaCrosse sedans; the standard Regal and Regal GS underwent a model update for 2021.

Sales

References

External links 

 

Regal
Flexible-fuel vehicles
Front-wheel-drive vehicles
Rear-wheel-drive vehicles
Mid-size cars
Sports sedans
Coupés
Station wagons
Cars introduced in 1973
1980s cars
1990s cars
2000s cars
2010s cars
2020s cars
Personal luxury cars